Al-Yamamah is a residential neighborhood and a subject of Baladiyah al-Batha in Riyadh, Saudi Arabia. It is bordered by al-Manfuhah neighborhood to the west, Southern Ring Road to the south and Manfuhah al-Jadidah to the north. It is named after the historical region of al-Yamama.

References 

Neighbourhoods in Riyadh